Sphedanolestes is a large genus of assassin bugs in the family (Reduviidae), subfamily Harpactorinae. There are more than 190 described species, which are found in southern Europe, Africa and Asia.

Species
BioLib lists the following:

 Sphedanolestes achteni Schouteden, 1932
 Sphedanolestes aequatorialis Schouteden, 1932
 Sphedanolestes alacer Miller, 1958
 Sphedanolestes albigula Breddin, 1905
 Sphedanolestes albipilosus Ishikawa, Cai & Tomokuni, 2007
 Sphedanolestes alboniger Villiers, 1969
 Sphedanolestes anabib Miller, 1956
 Sphedanolestes anellus Hsiao, 1979
 Sphedanolestes angolensis Villiers, 1952
 Sphedanolestes angularis Reuter, 1887
 Sphedanolestes annulatus Linnavuori, 1961
 Sphedanolestes annulicollis Villiers, 1948
 Sphedanolestes annulipes Distant, 1903
 Sphedanolestes arciferus Villiers, 1975
 Sphedanolestes argenteolineatus (A. Costa, 1883)
 Sphedanolestes aruanus Miller, 1958
 Sphedanolestes aurescens Distant, 1919
 Sphedanolestes aureus Moulet, 2001
 Sphedanolestes avidus Miller, 1941
 Sphedanolestes badgleyi Distant, 1909
 Sphedanolestes bastardi Villiers, 1969
 Sphedanolestes bekiliensis Villiers, 1960
 Sphedanolestes bellus Stål, 1874
 Sphedanolestes bicolor Schouteden, 1910
 Sphedanolestes bicoloripes (Distant, 1881)
 Sphedanolestes bicoloroides P. V. Putshkov, 1987
 Sphedanolestes bicolorous Livingstone & Ravichandran, 1990
 Sphedanolestes bimaculatus Miller, 1953
 Sphedanolestes bituberculatus (Jakovlev, 1893)
 Sphedanolestes bizonatus Villiers, 1969
 Sphedanolestes bowringi Distant, 1909
 Sphedanolestes bredoi Schouteden, 1952
 Sphedanolestes burgeoni Schouteden, 1932
 Sphedanolestes cachani Villiers, 1959
 Sphedanolestes callani Villiers, 1960
 Sphedanolestes cameronicus Miller, 1941
 Sphedanolestes cheesmanae Miller, 1958
 Sphedanolestes cincticeps Miller, 1950
 Sphedanolestes cingulatus (Fieber, 1864)
 Sphedanolestes citrinus Miller, 1958
 Sphedanolestes collarti Schouteden, 1932
 Sphedanolestes compressipes Stål, 1874
 Sphedanolestes conspicuus Miller, 1958
 Sphedanolestes corallinus Distant, 1904
 Sphedanolestes dekeyseri Villiers, 1948
 Sphedanolestes delattrei Villiers, 1948
 Sphedanolestes discifer Reuter, 1881
 Sphedanolestes discopygus Miller, 1954
 Sphedanolestes distinctus Schouteden, 1932
 Sphedanolestes dives Distant, 1904
 Sphedanolestes dorchymonti Dispons, 1968
 Sphedanolestes dromedarius Reuter, 1881
 Sphedanolestes dumbicus Schouteden, 1932
 Sphedanolestes elegans Distant, 1903
 Sphedanolestes exilis Miller, 1958
 Sphedanolestes fallax Miller, 1941
 Sphedanolestes fasciativentris (Stål, 1855)
 Sphedanolestes femoralis Distant, 1919
 Sphedanolestes fenestratus Linnavuori, 1969
 Sphedanolestes festus Miller, 1958
 Sphedanolestes flaviventris Distant, 1919
 Sphedanolestes fraterculus Bergroth, 1908
 Sphedanolestes freyi Villiers, 1970
 Sphedanolestes funeralis Distant, 1903
 Sphedanolestes gestuosus (Stål, 1861)
 Sphedanolestes ghesquierei Schouteden, 1932
 Sphedanolestes granulipes Hsiao & Ren, 1981
 Sphedanolestes guerze Villiers, 1948
 Sphedanolestes gularis Hsiao, 1979
 Sphedanolestes gulo (Stål, 1863)
 Sphedanolestes haematopterus (Germar, 1837)
 Sphedanolestes hemiochrus (Stål, 1870)
 Sphedanolestes hendrickxi Schouteden, 1952
 Sphedanolestes himalayensis Distant, 1909
 Sphedanolestes hirtipes Villiers, 1948
 Sphedanolestes histrio Miller, 1958
 Sphedanolestes holasi Villiers, 1950
 Sphedanolestes horvathi Lindberg, 1932
 Sphedanolestes impressicollis (Stål, 1861)
 Sphedanolestes incertus Distant, 1903
 Sphedanolestes indicus Reuter, 1881
 Sphedanolestes insignis Miller, 1950
 Sphedanolestes insulanus Miller, 1941
 Sphedanolestes ivohibensis Villiers, 1969
 Sphedanolestes janssensi Villiers, 1954
 Sphedanolestes jucundus (Stål, 1866)
 Sphedanolestes karschi Schouteden, 1932
 Sphedanolestes kasaicus Schouteden, 1932
 Sphedanolestes katangae Schouteden, 1932
 Sphedanolestes keiseri Villiers, 1969
 Sphedanolestes kerandeli Villiers, 1948
 Sphedanolestes kolleri Schouteden, 1911
 Sphedanolestes lamottei Villiers, 1948
 Sphedanolestes lativentris Villiers, 1982
 Sphedanolestes leeweni Miller, 1958
 Sphedanolestes leroyi Schouteden, 1952
 Sphedanolestes leucorum Miller, 1941
 Sphedanolestes liberiensis Villiers, 1950
 Sphedanolestes lieftincki Miller, 1958
 Sphedanolestes limbativentris Breddin, 1913
 Sphedanolestes lipskii Kiritshenko, 1914
 Sphedanolestes lividigaster (Mulsant & Rey, 1852)
 Sphedanolestes lucidus Miller, 1958
 Sphedanolestes lucorum Miller, 1941
 Sphedanolestes lugens Schouteden, 1952
 Sphedanolestes lundqvisti Miller, 1958
 Sphedanolestes mangenoti Villiers, 1959
 Sphedanolestes marginiventris Distant, 1919
 Sphedanolestes massarti Schouteden, 1952
 Sphedanolestes mateui Villiers, 1982
 Sphedanolestes mayumbensis Schouteden, 1932
 Sphedanolestes meeli Villiers, 1954
 Sphedanolestes meinanderi Villiers, 1969
 Sphedanolestes melanocephalus (Stål, 1863)
 Sphedanolestes mendicus (Stål, 1866)
 Sphedanolestes minusculus Bergroth, 1908
 Sphedanolestes modestus Miller, 1941
 Sphedanolestes nanulus Breddin, 1912
 Sphedanolestes nanus (Stål, 1855)
 Sphedanolestes nigricollis Miller, 1958
 Sphedanolestes nigrirostris Villiers, 1948
 Sphedanolestes nigriventris Schouteden, 1932
 Sphedanolestes nigrocephala Livingstone & Ravichandran, 1990
 Sphedanolestes nigroruber (Dohrn, 1860)
 Sphedanolestes nigrosetosus Villiers, 1976
 Sphedanolestes nodipes Li J, 1981
 Sphedanolestes noualhieri Villiers, 1960
 Sphedanolestes olthofi Miller, 1958
 Sphedanolestes ornaticollis Linnavuori, 1965
 Sphedanolestes oshanini (Reuter, 1877)
 Sphedanolestes par Miller, 1941
 Sphedanolestes pauliani Villiers, 1966
 Sphedanolestes peltigerus Miller, 1956
 Sphedanolestes perrisi (Puton, 1873)
 Sphedanolestes personatus Miller, 1956
 Sphedanolestes piceus Villiers, 1948
 Sphedanolestes picturellus Schouteden, 1932
 Sphedanolestes pilosus Hsiao, 1979
 Sphedanolestes poecilus Miller, 1956
 Sphedanolestes politus (Stål, 1870)
 Sphedanolestes pubinotum Reuter, 1881
 Sphedanolestes pulchellus (Klug, 1830)
 Sphedanolestes pulcher Schouteden, 1906
 Sphedanolestes pulchriventris (Stål, 1863)
 Sphedanolestes quadrinotatus W.Z. Cai, X.Y. Cai & Y.Z. Wang, 2004
 Sphedanolestes raptor Miller, 1941
 Sphedanolestes renaudi Villiers, 1969
 Sphedanolestes riffensis Vidal, 1936
 Sphedanolestes rubecula Distant, 1909
 Sphedanolestes rubicollis Miller, 1958
 Sphedanolestes rubripes W.Z. Cai, X.Y. Cai & Y.Z. Wang, 2004
 Sphedanolestes rugosus Schouteden, 1952
 Sphedanolestes rutshuricus Schouteden, 1944
 Sphedanolestes sabronensis Miller, 1958
 Sphedanolestes sanguineus (Fabricius, 1794)
 Sphedanolestes sarawakensis Miller, 1941
 Sphedanolestes saucius (Stål, 1861)
 Sphedanolestes scandens Miller, 1941
 Sphedanolestes semicroceus Breddin, 1900
 Sphedanolestes sericatus Breddin, 1903
 Sphedanolestes setigerus Villiers, 1973
 Sphedanolestes seyrigi Villiers, 1960
 Sphedanolestes shelfordi Miller, 1941
 Sphedanolestes signatus Distant, 1903
 Sphedanolestes sinicus Cai & S. Yang, 2002
 Sphedanolestes sjoestedti Villiers, 1948
 Sphedanolestes sordidipennis (Dohrn, 1860)
 Sphedanolestes stali Schouteden, 1932
 Sphedanolestes stigmatellus Distant, 1903
 Sphedanolestes subflaviceps (Signoret, 1860)
 Sphedanolestes subtilis (Jakovlev, 1893)
 Sphedanolestes testaceipes Villiers, 1948
 Sphedanolestes toxopeusi Miller, 1958
 Sphedanolestes trichrous Stål, 1874
 Sphedanolestes tricolor Schouteden, 1952
 Sphedanolestes uelensis Schouteden, 1952
 Sphedanolestes upemhensis Villiers, 1954
 Sphedanolestes vallespir Dispons, 1960
 Sphedanolestes variabilis Distant, 1904
 Sphedanolestes varipes Villiers, 1948
 Sphedanolestes verecundus (Stål, 1863)
 Sphedanolestes verhulsti Schouteden, 1944
 Sphedanolestes vesbioides Breddin, 1903
 Sphedanolestes viduus Miller, 1958
 Sphedanolestes wallacei Miller, 1958
 Sphedanolestes wellmani Bergroth, 1908
 Sphedanolestes wollastoni Miller, 1958
 Sphedanolestes xanthogaster (Stål, 1863)
 Sphedanolestes xiongi W.Z. Cai, X.Y. Cai & Y.Z. Wang, 2004
 Sphedanolestes yunnanensis Maldonado, 1979
 Sphedanolestes zhengi Zhao, Ren, Wang & Cai, 2015

References

External links

Reduviidae
Hemiptera genera
Hemiptera of Europe
Hemiptera of Africa
Hemiptera of Asia